Ken Eklund (born May 17, 1957) is an American game and experience designer known as Writerguy. He is perhaps most famous for World Without Oil, an early "serious game" in the alternate reality game genre he created and ran in 2007. His recent projects "explore the positive social effects of collaborative experiences and open-ended, creative play. "

Philosophy 

Eklund creates immersive games that intend to have a socially relevant, transformative effect and to be informal learning experiences and crowdsourcing for good. Much of his recent transmedia work explores how contributing to 'authentic fictions' (real-seeming yet fictional stories) engages people directly in real-world issues by allowing them to have fun collaborating on storymaking, positive solutions and action. By creating "barely fictional" gameful situations he creates a new kind of space for negotiating reality, where the candor afforded by interacting with fictional characters presenting the reality of social issues is seemingly more impactful than the realities themselves.

As an artist, Eklund's emphasis on response plus respect for diversity "charges notions of the 'vox pop' with an appealing edge as a tool for transformation 'from the inside'. He speaks on how to use alternate reality experiences and other playful "what if?" spaces in pursuit of serious goals and the potential for gamelike activities to help solve global problems.

Works 

 FutureCoast (2014-2016, director)
 Rogue Squirrelbot (2015, director/producer)
 Ruination: City of Dust (2014, designer)
 Hiss Pop (2012, co-creator)
 Ed Zed Omega (2012, director/lead producer)
 Giskin Anomaly (2010, creator/writer)
 Urgent Evoke (2010, community lead)
 Zorop (2010, co-creator)
 Ruby's Bequest (2009, creator)
 World Without Oil (2007, creator)
 Driver: Vegas (mobile) (2006, writer)
 Marc Eckō's Getting Up: Contents Under Pressure (mobile) (2006, writer)
 In Her Shoes (mobile) (2006, writer)
 Move It! (2005, designer/writer)
 Mr. & Mrs. Smith (mobile) (2005, writer)
 Strange Dead Bird (2004, creator)
 Tigo (2003, writer)
 Two Forks, Idaho (2002, creator)
 Mystery of the Poison Dart Frog (2002, creator)
 Pool of Radiance: Ruins of Myth Drannor (2001, writer/designer)
 Star Trek: Deep Space Nine - Harbinger (1995, writer/designer)
 World of Aden: Entomorph - Plague of the Darkfall (1995, writer)
 Al-Qadim: The Genie's Curse (1994, writer)
 Dark Sun: Wake of the Ravager (1994, writer)
 Eagle Eye Mysteries in London (1994, writer/game, character designer)
 Eagle Eye Mysteries (1993, writer/game, character designer)
 Buck Rogers: Matrix Cubed (1992 writer)
 The Dark Queen of Krynn (1992, writer)
 Death Knights of Krynn (1991, writer)
 Buck Rogers: Countdown to Doomsday (1990, writer)

Awards and honors

References

External links 

Ken Eklund at MobyGames
Eklund and Sara Thacher interviewed by Stuart Candy at Situation Lab
Eklund interviewed about his practice by Fan Sissoko for Innovation Unit
Molly Ebner interviews Ken Eklund for the Do Art Foundation
Eklund featured in "State of Play," BBC Radio 4
Eklund interviewed at GamesForChange
Eklund interviewed by StoryForward
After one year: Giskin Anomaly in Balboa Park
Ruby's Bequest at the Institute For The Future
 Eklund interviewed by Lance Weiler at The Workbook Project
 Eklund profiled in Santa Clara Magazine
It's The End Of The World (As We Know It) on TTBOOK
 World Without Oil featured in CURRENT
 Cisco summary document of World Without Oil (PDF)

1957 births
American video game designers
Living people
People from San Francisco
Santa Clara University alumni
Video game writers
American game designers
Transmediation